The Brownsville Veterans Port of Entry opened in 1999 with the completion of the Veterans International Bridge at Los Tomates.  The bridge was built primarily to divert commercial freight traffic away from the busy downtown bridges, but about a third of the passenger vehicles also cross at this point.  The Veterans Port of Entry is the easternmost US-Mexico border crossing, and is by far the newest of the three crossings between Brownsville and Matamoros.

References

See also

 List of Mexico–United States border crossings
 List of Canada–United States border crossings

Mexico–United States border crossings
U.S. Route 83
1999 establishments in Texas
Buildings and structures completed in 1999
Buildings and structures in Cameron County, Texas